Estakhr-e Garuk (also Romanized as Estakhr-e Garūk; also known as Estakhr-e Gorank, Estakhr-e Karnak, Estakhr-e Karūk, and Estakhr Korūk) is a village in Sarduiyeh Rural District, Sarduiyeh District, Jiroft County, Kerman Province, Iran. At the 2006 census, its population was 18, in 5 families.

References 

Populated places in Jiroft County